Tyler Walker (born April 10, 1986) is a sit-skier with lumbar sacral agenesis. He competed for the United States at the 2014 Winter Paralympics where a crash caused him to not finish. His competition for the United States at the 2018 Winter Paralympics proved more successful and he won two silver medals.

References

External links 
 
 

1986 births
Living people
American male alpine skiers
American disabled sportspeople
Paralympic alpine skiers of the United States
Paralympic silver medalists for the United States
Alpine skiers at the 2014 Winter Paralympics
Alpine skiers at the 2018 Winter Paralympics
Medalists at the 2018 Winter Paralympics
Paralympic medalists in alpine skiing